Lincoln County is located in the eastern part of the U.S. state of Missouri. As of the 2020 census, the population was 59,574. Its county seat is Troy. The county was founded December 14, 1818, and named for Major General Benjamin Lincoln of the American Revolutionary War.

Lincoln County is part of the St. Louis, MO-IL Metropolitan Statistical Area.

History
According to Goodspeed's History of Lincoln County, Missouri (1888), Lincoln County was named by Major Christopher Clark, the first permanent white settler in an address to the Territorial Legislature. He said, "I was born, sir, in Link-Horn County, N.C., I lived for many years in Link-Horn County in old Kain-tuck. I wish to die in Link-Horn County, in Missouri; and I move, therefore, that the blank in the bill be filled with the name Link-Horn." The motion was carried unanimously and the clerk, not adopting the frontier parlance of the Major, wrote "Lincoln" in the blank space of the bill. Others  say it was named for Major General Benjamin Lincoln, who served in the Continental Army during the American Revolution.

Notable people
Frederick Gilmer Bonfils - Denver Post publisher 
Clarence Cannon - Congressmember and notable U.S. House Parliamentarian from Elsberry, Missouri

Geography
The county's eastern border with Illinois is formed by the Mississippi River.

Adjacent counties
Pike County (north)
Calhoun County, Illinois (east)
St. Charles County (southeast)
Warren County (southwest)
Montgomery County (west)

Major highways
 U.S. Route 61
 Route 47
 Route 79
 Route 147

Demographics

As of the census of 2000, there were 38,944 people, 13,851 households, and 10,554 families residing in the county. There were 15,511 housing units at an average density of 25 per square mile (10/km2). The racial makeup of the county was 96.13% White, 1.74% Black or African American, 0.37% Native American, 0.17% Asian, 0.03% Pacific Islander, 0.43% from other races, and 1.14% from two or more races. Approximately 1.14% of the population were Hispanic or Latino of any race. 37.7% were of German, 17.0% American, 10.9% Irish and 7.4% English ancestry.

There were 13,851 households, out of which 40.00% had children under the age of 18 living with them, 61.50% were married couples living together, 10.10% had a female householder with no husband present, and 23.80% were non-families. 19.70% of all households were made up of individuals, and 7.70% had someone living alone who was 65 years of age or older.  The average household size was 2.77 and the average family size was 3.17.

In the county, the population was spread out, with 30.00% under the age of 18, 8.10% from 18 to 24, 30.20% from 25 to 44, 21.00% from 45 to 64, and 10.80% who were 65 years of age or older.  The median age was 34 years. For every 100 females there were 98.40 males.  For every 100 females age 18 and over, there were 97.90 males.

The median income for a household in the county was $42,592, and the median income for a family was $47,747. Males had a median income of $35,564 versus $23,270 for females. The per capita income for the county was $17,149.  About 6.20% of families and 8.30% of the population were below the poverty line, including 9.60% of those under age 18 and 9.00% of those age 65 or over.

2020 Census

Education

Public schools
Silex R-I School District – Silex
Silex Elementary School (K-06) 
Silex High School (07-12)
Elsberry R-II School District – Elsberry 
Clarence Cannon Elementary School (PK-04) 
Ida Cannon Middle School (05-08) 
Elsberry High School (09-12)
Troy R-III School District – Troy
Early Childhood Education Center (Pre-K & PAT)
Boone Elementary School (K-05)
Claude Brown Elementary School (K-05)
Cuivre Park Elementary School (K-05) 
Hawk Point Elementary School (K-05)
Lincoln Elementary School (K-05) 
Main Street Elementary School (K-05) 
William R. Cappel Elementary School (K-05)
Troy Middle School (06-08)
Troy South Middle School (06-08) 
Ninth Grade Center (09) 
Troy Buchanan High School (10-12)
New Horizons High School (10-12)
Winfield R-IV School District – Winfield
Winfield Elementary School (PK-02) 
Winfield Intermediate School (03-05) 
Winfield Middle School (06-08) 
Winfield High School (09-12)
Wright City R-II - Wright City
Additionally, the Wright City R-II serves southern portions of Lincoln County.

Private schools
Calvary Christian School – Winfield (01-12) – Pentecostal
First Baptist Christian Academy - Troy (K-08) - Baptist
Immaculate Conception School – Old Monroe (K-08) – Roman Catholic
Sacred Heart School – Troy (K-08) – Roman Catholic
St. Alphonsus School – Silex (PK-08) – Roman Catholic
Troy Holiness School – Troy (K-12) – Methodist

Public libraries
 Powell Memorial Library

Politics

Local
The Republican Party mostly controls politics at the local level in Lincoln County. Republicans hold all but four of the elected positions in the county.

State

Lincoln County is divided into three legislative districts in the Missouri House of Representatives.

District 40 — Chad Perkins (R-Bowling Green).  Consists of the northernmost section of the county.

District 41 — Randy Pietzman (R-Troy).  Consists of most of the entire county and includes the communities of Cave, Elsberry, Foley, Hawk Point, Silex, Troy, Truxton, and Whiteside.

District 64 — Tony Lovasco (R- O'Fallon) Includes the southeast corner of the county and the communities of Chain of Rocks, Fountain N' Lakes, Moscow Mills, Old Monroe, and Winfield.

All of Lincoln County is a part of Missouri's 10th District in the Missouri Senate and is currently represented by Jeanie Riddle (R-Fulton).

Federal

All of Lincoln County is included in Missouri's 3rd Congressional District and is currently represented by Blaine Luetkemeyer (R-St. Elizabeth) in the U.S. House of Representatives.

Communities

Cities and villages

Cave
Chain of Rocks
Elsberry
Foley
Fountain N' Lakes
Hawk Point
Moscow Mills
Old Monroe
Silex
Troy (county seat)
Truxton
Whiteside
Winfield

Unincorporated communities

Apex
 Argentville
Auburn
Brevator
Briscoe
Brussells
 Cap au Gris
Chantilly
Corso
 Dameron
Davis
 Ethlyn
 Fairview
Famous
Louisville
Mackville
Millwood
New Hope
Okete
Olney
 South Troy

See also
National Register of Historic Places listings in Lincoln County, Missouri

References

Further reading
 History of Lincoln County, Missouri, from the earliest time to the present: including a department devoted to the preservation of sundry personal, business, professional and private records, besides a valuable fund of notes original observation.... (1888) full text

External links
 Digitized 1930 Plat Book of Lincoln County  from University of Missouri Division of Special Collections, Archives, and Rare Books

 
Missouri counties on the Mississippi River
Regions of Greater St. Louis
1818 establishments in Missouri Territory
Populated places established in 1818